The Dominican Summer League Giants or DSL Giants are a minor league baseball team in the Dominican Summer League. The team plays in the Boca Chica South division and is affiliated with the San Francisco Giants.

History
The team first came into existence in 1989, as one of the DSL's original American minor league teams.  They shared an affiliation with the Detroit Tigers and were known as the DSL Tigers/Giants.

They were independently affiliated with the Giants from 1990 to 1992, before gaining an affiliation with the Philadelphia Phillies and the Houston Astros in 1993.  For 1994, they shared an affiliation with the Baltimore Orioles.

The team became independently affiliated with the Giants again in 1995 and have been so ever since.

Notable players

 Kervin Castro (born 1999), Venezuelan baseball pitcher for the San Francisco Giants

Rosters

References

San Francisco Giants minor league affiliates
Dominican Summer League teams
Baseball teams in the Dominican Republic